Cercospora apiicola  is a fungal plant pathogen, who causes leaf spot on celery.

References

apiicola
Fungal plant pathogens and diseases
Eudicot diseases